Erling C. Theller (December 28, 1887 – February 20, 1953) was an American football and basketball coach. He served as the head football coach at Presbyterian College in Clinton, South Carolina in 1914, compiling a record of 4–1–1. Theller was a 1913 graduate of Oberlin College in Oberlin, Ohio. He later coached high school football at Glenville High School in Cuyahoga County, Ohio, where he coached future National Football League (NFL) star Benny Friedman. Theller was also the head basketball coach at John Carroll University in University Heights, Ohio from 1927 to 1930, tallying a mark of 19–23.

Head coaching record

College football

References

External links
 

1887 births
1953 deaths
John Carroll Blue Streaks men's basketball coaches
Presbyterian Blue Hose football coaches
High school football coaches in Ohio
Oberlin College alumni